Manoharan is a surname. Notable people with the surname include:

K. Manoharan, Indian politician
Kiru Manoharan, one time ASB Tennis Centre Court player
M. Manoharan (born 1961), Malaysian lawyer
Manoj Thonipurakkal Manoharan (born 1991), Indian footballer
Nanjil K. Manoharan (1929–2000), Indian politician
R. Manoharan, Indian politician
T. N. Manoharan (born 1956), Indian accountant
Vincent Manoharan, Indian activist
Vinoop Manoharan (born 1992), Indian cricketer